The Alfred and Rosy Skinner House at 232 W. 800 S. in Orem, Utah was built in 1905.  It was listed on the National Register of Historic Places in 1998.

It was a work of stonemason/builder John J. Hill.

References

Neoclassical architecture in Utah
Houses completed in 1905
Houses in Orem, Utah
Houses on the National Register of Historic Places in Utah
National Register of Historic Places in Orem, Utah
1905 establishments in Utah